Wuhan University School of Foreign Languages and Literature is a school of Wuhan University.

The college offers Bachelor and Master programs in English, French, German, Russian, and Japanese languages. The English major program has the largest enrollment. More than 100 students are enrolled in the French program including postgraduates.

References 

Wuhan University Faculty of Humanities